Louis Thomas Rebisso (1837 in Italy – 3 May 1899 in Norwood, Ohio) was an Italian-born American sculptor and teacher.

Biography
In Italy, Rebisso studied with the sculptor Rubalto and in an art academy under Varni. At 20, he joined in Giuseppe Mazzini's attempt to establish an Italian republic, and was obliged to leave Italy.

Taking refuge in the United States, he settled in Boston, Massachusetts, where he worked for several years in monument yards. Subsequently, he settled in Cincinnati, Ohio, where he spent the most productive years of his career, and his name as an artist developed. Rebisso sculpted the bronze statue of William Henry Harrison in Cincinnati's Piatt Park. Among those who studied with him at the Art Academy of Cincinnati were William Jacob Baer, Clement Barnhorn, Solon Borglum, Janet Scudder, Mary Chase Perry, Louise Lawson, Enid Yandell, Anna Marie Valentien, and Eli Harvey .

Selected commissions

References

External links

1837 births
1899 deaths
19th-century American sculptors
19th-century American male artists
American male sculptors
Italian emigrants to the United States
People from Norwood, Ohio
Sculptors from Ohio